Deen Maar Indigenous Protected Area is an Indigenous Protected Area (IPA) located in south-west Victoria, Australia on land bounded by the Eumeralla River and Bass Strait. The country consists of limestone ridges, wetlands, lakes and sand dunes. It is the traditional home of the Peek Whurrong speakers of the Dhauwurdwurung (Gunditjmara) Nation. The IPA takes its name from Deen Maar ("this man here") Island (Lady Julia Percy Island), which lies a short distance off the coast. It is classified as an IUCN Category VI protected area. It is within the boundaries of the Yambuk Important Bird Area, identified as such by BirdLife International because of its importance for the conservation of threatened species such as the orange-bellied parrot and hooded plover.

History
In 1842 Deen Maar was the site of conflict between the indigenous people of the area and European colonists. This conflict is referred to as the Eumerella Wars and took place over 20 years in the mid-19th century. The remains of people involved in the conflict are at Deen Maar.

The property was purchased in 1993 by ATSIC for the Framlingham Aboriginal Trust with the intention that it become an Indigenous Protected Area (IPA), it was granted this status in 1999. It was the first IPA in Victoria.

See also
 Gunditjmara
 List of massacres of indigenous Australians
 Protected areas of Australia

References

External links 
  Deen Maar Indigenous protected area 
 Strategy for Aboriginal Managed Lands in Victoria
 Growfish - Gippsland Aquaculture Industry Network

Indigenous Protected Areas of Australia
Protected areas of Victoria (Australia)
Aboriginal communities in Victoria (Australia)
Protected areas established in 1999
1999 establishments in Australia